Jiangxia Station, known as Chentiancun Station during planning, is a metro station on Line 2 of the Guangzhou Metro. It is located under the north of Jiangxia East Second Road and the west of Baiyun Shangcheng Garden, in the Baiyun District of Guangzhou. It started operation on 25September 2010.

References

Railway stations in China opened in 2010
Guangzhou Metro stations in Baiyun District